Pine Creek Gristmill is a historic building located in Wildcat Den State Park in Muscatine County, Iowa, United States.  The building was listed on the National Register of Historic Places in 1979.

History
Benjamin Nye was one of the first residents to the area after it was opened to settlement in 1833.  He and his cousin built their homes near the Mississippi River and named the settlement Montpelier as they were originally from Vermont.  He built his first mill in 1835, but it was washed out because it was built too close to the river.  Nye built a saw mill further upstream on Pine Creek.  Two years later he added a gristmill across the creek.  He also built the county's first store and post office.  As his business expanded the present mill was built by Nye in 1848 for $10,000 with timber he cut in his own mill.  Benjamin Nye died in 1852 and the mill passed to his son-in-law Robert Patterson.  Herman Huchendorf, a German immigrant to Muscatine County, had bought the mill by the time the Pine Mill Bridge was erected in 1878.  The creek was easily crossed for most of the year, but when the water was high it was difficult for farmers to bring their grain to the mill.  While this was one of numerous bridge and mill combinations across the state of Iowa it is the only one that remains in place today.

The mill essentially appears as it has since the 1920s and is a virtual museum of the range of milling processes that were used between 1848 and 1929.  Originally the mill had two sets of millstones that produced flour from wheat that was grown locally.  It used a process known in the trade as the “New Process.”  The mill was reequipped in 1880 when its technology became obsolete.

Architecture
The building was built of native oak beams. It utilizes mortise and tenon joints that are connected with wooden pegs.

The mill itself is powered by a 20-horsepower water turbine that has a 40-horsepower steam engine back-up when the water level is low.  The mill has three separate plants in it. The main plant is a “three stand” double roller mill that produced wheat flour and is located on all three floors.  A single stand triple roller milling plant was added to mill corn.  It includes a set of  grindstones to produce Buckwheat flour.

References

External links
Wildcat Den State Park Documentary produced by Iowa Public Television

Industrial buildings completed in 1848
National Register of Historic Places in Muscatine County, Iowa
Museums in Muscatine County, Iowa
Grinding mills on the National Register of Historic Places in Iowa
Flour mills in the United States
Mill museums in Iowa
Grinding mills in Iowa
1848 establishments in Iowa